Dave Kruger is a former American football defensive end who is currently president of the Kruger Real Estate Group and advises individuals as a personal coach. He graduated from the University of Utah. He played college football at Utah, where he was on leadership committee for two years and captain in his senior year. He is the brother of Cleveland Browns outside linebacker Paul Kruger and Philadelphia Eagles defensive end Joe Kruger. He signed with the Cleveland Browns after the 2013 NFL draft as an undrafted free agent.

Early years
Kruger attended Timpanogos High School in Orem, Utah. He was named to the All-State, All-Region and All-Valley in his senior season in high school. In his junior season at high school, he led the class 5A in sacks in the regular season, and he also had 13 sacks in his senior season. He also was ranked as the 48th prospect among defensive tackles in the nation by scout.com.

College career
He finished college with a total of 116 tackles, five sacks, and one forced fumble. In his freshman season, he was selected to the rivals.com second-team Freshman All-American team.

Professional career

Cleveland Browns
On April 27, 2013, he signed Cleveland Browns as an undrafted free agent at the end of the 2013 NFL draft. He was waived on August 25, 2013.

Personal life
He is the son of Paul and Jennifer Kruger, and has three brothers and two sisters.  His brother Paul Kruger currently plays defensive end for the New Orleans Saints and his younger brother Joe Kruger is a defensive end for the Pittsburgh Steelers. He is now president of Kruger Real Estate Group and advises as personal coach for individuals.

References

External links
Utah Utes bio

1990 births
Living people
Sportspeople from Orem, Utah
Players of American football from Utah
American football defensive tackles
Utah Utes football players